In the context of the COVID-19 pandemic, a support bubble may refer to:
 First COVID-19 tier regulations in England#Linked households – regulations in England
 COVID-19 pandemic in New Zealand#Support bubble – regulations in New Zealand